The Chestnuts are deciduous tree and shrub species in the genus Castanea.  The name also refers to the edible nut these trees produce.

Chestnut may also refer to:

Flora and fauna

Botany
 American chestnut, one of the most important forest trees throughout much of the eastern United States and southeasternmost Canada
Chestnut mushroom, Agaricus bisporus
 Chestnut oak, species of oak in the white oak group
 Chinese chestnut
Castanea mollissima, species of chestnut native to China
Sterculia monosperma, also known as Thai chestnut
 Guiana chestnut, a name for Pachira aquatica
 Horse chestnut, member of the genus Aesculus
 Japanese chestnut, species of chestnut native to Japan and South Korea
 Malabar chestnut, a name for Pachira aquatica
 Swamp chestnut oak, species of oak in the white oak section Quercus
 Sweet chestnut, species of chestnut native to southeastern Europe and Asia Minor
 Water chestnut
 Eleocharis dulcis
 Water caltrop (Trapa natans)

Zoology
 Chestnut (coat), color of horse
 Chestnut (horse anatomy), a natural callus on the legs of horses
 Chestnut dunnart, dunnart that was described by Van Dyck in 1986
 Chestnut sparrow, sparrow that likes dry savanna
 Chestnut teal, dabbling duck found in southern Australia
 Chestnut woodpecker, resident breeding bird in South America
 Chestnut or Conistra vaccinii, a moth of the family Noctuidae

Places 
United States
 Chestnut, Illinois, a census-designated place
 Chestnut, Louisiana, an unincorporated community
Chestnut Creek, Virginia
 Chestnut Mountain (Caldwell County, North Carolina), a mountain
 Chestnut Mountain (Transylvania County, North Carolina), a mountain
Chestnut Township, Knox County, Illinois

People
 Chestnut (surname)

Arts, entertainment, and media
Chestnut (dance), a dance for three couples by John Playford
 Chestnut (joke), British slang for an old or stale joke
 Chestnut (music), a piece of music that has been played so much that many people are tired of it
 "Chestnut" (Westworld), an episode of the HBO series Westworld
 Chestnut (film), an upcoming drama film
 Chestnut: Hero of Central Park, a 2004 American family film
Chestnut Tree, a dance popular in 1930s England, based on a nursery rhyme, discussed in Chapter 2, on page 25 of Joshua Levin's non-fiction book Dunkirk: The History Behind the Major Motion Picture (2017)

Buildings
 Chestnut Hall, Philadelphia, Pennsylvania, formerly the Pennsylvania Hotel, on the National Register of Historic Buildings
 Chestnut Lodge, a historic building in Rockville, Maryland
 Chestnut Residence, a university residence operated by University of Toronto, Canada

Other uses
 Chestnut (color), reddish brown
 Chestnut Canoe Company, a Canadian company that closed in 1979
 Chestnut hair, reddish brown hair
 Operation Chestnut, a failed British Second World War raid
 , a World War II anti-submarine net laying ship

See also
 Chestnut Hill (disambiguation)
 Chestnut Ridge (disambiguation)
 Chestnut Street (disambiguation)
 Charles Chesnutt